The North–South Shrine Game was an annual postseason college football all-star game played each December from 1948 to 1973 in Miami, and a final time in 1976 in Pontiac, Michigan. The game was sponsored by the fraternal group Shriners International, with proceeds used to support the Shriners Hospitals for Crippled Children. The full name of the game when played in Miami, as listed on programs, was the Mahi Shrine's North–South College All-Star Football Game.

History
In the early 1930s, there were several college all-star charity games organized between North and South teams. These were held in various locations, and benefitted different charitable causes.  While listed in NCAA records, these games were unrelated to the series started in Florida after World War II.

The first two playings of the Miami-based Shrine game, in 1946 and 1947, were contested between high school football teams. Lynn Classical High School from Massachusetts, led by future Boston Red Sox player Harry Agganis, won the first game, while Miami High School won the second game. In October 1948, game organizers announced their intent to invite college football players, noting "there will be enough players for both of us", in reference to the Blue–Gray Football Classic being played in Montgomery, Alabama. Andy Gustafson of Miami and Herman Hickman of Yale, who would both be inducted to the College Football Hall of Fame, were signed to five-year contracts to coach the South and North teams, respectively.

After switching to a college all-star format, the game drew many top players and coaches during its history, such as George Blanda as South quarterback in 1948, and Ara Parseghian as North head coach in 1958. The 1964 game featured two Heisman Trophy winners; John Huarte, that year's recipient, and Roger Staubach, who had won the award in 1963 as a junior. Organizers sought to make the games competitive, including a special rule that allowed a team to receive a kickoff after scoring, if they were still trailing.

The 1956 game created some controversy, when singer Harry Belafonte was invited, and then apparently uninvited, to perform the national anthem before the game. Belafonte felt the incident was racially motivated, which game organizers denied; Belafonte was ultimately allowed to sing, although without accompaniment. At the time, the game was still segregated, as African-American players were not included on the South team until Willie Richardson and Bob Paremore in 1962. In the 1962 game, Richardson was selected as South team MVP, and Paremore received the game's sportsmanship award.

The Shrine executive committee voted to discontinue the Miami-based games after 1973, due to sparse attendance and the failure to secure a national television contract. Organizers in Michigan cited scheduling difficulties and a desire "to solicit a TV package", in not continuing the game beyond 1976.

A similar game, the East–West Shrine Game, has been played since 1925.

Game results

Early years: college all-star teams

Notes:
The January 1930 game was a Southern Conference all-star game.
The January 1934 game was a Southeastern Conference all-star game.

Shrine games: high school teams

Shrine games: college all-star teams

Notes:
Overall record for Shrine games: South (14–12–1) in college games; South (15–13–1) including high school games.
All Shrine games played at the Miami Orange Bowl, except for the 1976 game, which was played at the Pontiac Silverdome.
The date of the 1949 game is incorrectly listed as December 25 in NCAA records; the game was played on Monday, December 26.

MVPs

Most MVP selections (college): 4, accomplished by Army, Notre Dame, and Miami (FL).

Sportsmanship award
(awarded intermittently)

 Herb Hannah was the father of John Hannah.

See also
List of college bowl games

References

Recurring sporting events established in 1948
Recurring sporting events disestablished in 1976
Shriners
Sports competitions in Miami
Orange Bowl